Singaporean Mandarin is a variety of Mandarin Chinese spoken natively in Singapore. It is one of the four official languages of Singapore along with English, Malay and Tamil.

Singaporean Mandarin can be classified into two distinct Mandarin dialects: Standard Singaporean Mandarin and Colloquial Singaporean Mandarin (Singdarin). These two dialects are easily distinguishable to a person proficient in Mandarin. The standard is the register of Mandarin used in more formal occasions in Singapore and can be heard on television and radio. It is also the form taught in all Singapore government schools, while the colloquial is the form used by the general populace in informal situations. Singaporean Mandarin has many unique loanwords from other Chinese dialects (such as Hokkien) as well as Singapore's other official languages of English, Malay and Tamil.

Singaporean Mandarin became widely spoken by the Chinese community in Singapore after the Speak Mandarin Campaign by the government in 1979. It is today considered to be the second most commonly spoken language in Singapore, after English. Due to its widespread usage, Singaporean Mandarin has replaced Singaporean Hokkien as the lingua franca of the Chinese community today. Following the economic rise of China in the 21st century, Mandarin proficiency has been viewed with greater importance and has risen in terms of prominence in Singapore. In 2010, there was an increase in the number of Singaporean population who know two or more languages.

With increasing influx of mainland Chinese from mainland China to Singapore since the beginning of the 21st century, Singaporean Mandarin has gradually inclined itself towards Standard Chinese, although there are unique differences that have been retained. Currently, Singaporean Mandarin continues to develop, with major influences coming from Standard Chinese, Taiwanese Mandarin and English. Since the 2010s, the percentage of Singaporean Chinese speaking Mandarin at home has begun to decrease, in favour of Singaporean English.

Overview

Standard Singaporean Mandarin

It is almost identical to the standard of Mandarin used in the People's Republic of China (known there as  ) and the Republic of China (Taiwan) (known there as  ). Standard Singaporean Mandarin, which is usually heard on Singaporean Mandarin-language TV and radio news broadcast, is generally more similar to Guoyu in terms of phonology, vocabulary and grammar than Putonghua. Small differences only appear in the form of lexicon.

Colloquial Singaporean Mandarin

In terms of colloquial spoken Mandarin, Singaporean Mandarin is subjected to influence from the local historical, cultural and social influences of Singapore. As such, there are remarkable differences between colloquial Singaporean Mandarin (Singdarin) and Standard Chinese, and a non-Singaporean Chinese speaking individual may find it difficult to understand Singdarin.

Features of Singaporean Mandarin

Singaporean Mandarin has preserved the vocabulary and certain other features from Classical Chinese and early Vernacular Chinese (早期白話; zǎoqī báihuà), dating back from the early 20th century. Since Singapore's Chinese medium schools adopted Chinese teaching materials from Republic of China in the early 20th century, Singapore's early Mandarin pronunciations was based on the Zhuyin in the Dictionary of National Pronunciation and Vocabulary of National Pronunciation for Everyday Use. As such, it had preserved many older forms of pronunciations. In addition, during its initial development, Singaporean Mandarin was also influenced by the other Chinese varieties of Singapore such as Hokkien, Teochew, Cantonese etc.

From 1949 to 1979, due to lack of contact between Singapore and People's Republic of China, Putonghua did not exert any form of influence on Singaporean Mandarin. On the contrary, the majority of Mandarin Chinese entertainment media, Chinese literature, books and reading materials in Singapore came mainly from Taiwan. As a result, Singaporean Mandarin has been influenced by Taiwanese Mandarin to a certain degree. After the 1980s, along with China's Open Door Policy, there was increasing contact between Singapore and mainland China, thus increasing Putonghua's gradual influence on Singaporean Mandarin. These influences included the adoption of pinyin and the shift from usage of  Traditional Chinese characters to Simplified Chinese characters. Much of the lexicon from Putonghua had also found its way into Singaporean Mandarin although not to a huge extent.

History

Background
Historical sources indicated that before 1819 when Sir Stamford Raffles came to Singapore, there were already Chinese settlers in Singapore. After 1819 when Sir Stamford Raffles set foot on Singapore, many Peranakan from Malayan and European merchants began to come to Singapore. Because they required large number of labourers, coolies were brought in from China to Singapore.

Large number of Chinese labourers came to Singapore after the Opium War. Chinese settlers who came to Singapore from China during the 19th and second half of the 20th century were known as "sinkeh". Amongst them were many contract labourers, including those who worked at the docks. Most of them came to Singapore to escape from poverty and to search for a better life, while others came to Singapore to escape from wars taking place in China during the first half of the 20th century. Most of them came from Southern Chinese provinces such as Fujian, Guangdong and Hainan.

Amongst these Sinkeh, there were many Hoklo (Hokkien), Teochew, Cantonese and Hainanese. They brought their own different native Chinese varieties to Singapore, including Hokkien, Teochew, Cantonese, Hakka and Hainanese. Because these varieties were mutually unintelligible, Chinese clans association were established based on their own ancestral home and dialect groups to help take care of their own people who speak the same dialect.

The use of Mandarin to serve as a lingua franca amongst the Chinese only began with the founding of Republic of China, which established Mandarin as the official tongue.

Development of Mandarin in Singapore
Before the 20th century, old-style private Chinese schools, known as sīshú in Singapore, generally used Chinese dialects (such as Hokkien, Teochew, Cantonese, etc.) as their medium of instruction to teach the Chinese classics and Classical Chinese. Singapore's first Mandarin-medium classes appeared around 1898, but Chinese dialect schools continued to exist up to 1909.

After the May Fourth Movement in 1919, under the influence from the New Culture Movement in China, the local Old-style private Chinese school in Singapore began to follow the new education reform as advocated by China's reformist. Thus, the language of medium in school changed from other Chinese dialects to Mandarin Chinese or Guóyǔ (國語). This marked the beginning of the development of Singaporean Mandarin.

However, at that time, there was no colloquial Standard Mandarin which could be used as a basis for learning Mandarin. In addition, during the early 1900s, most Mandarin teachers in Singapore came from southern parts of China, and had strong southern Chinese accents. Thus, the pronunciations in Singaporean Mandarin were under heavy influence from China's southern Chinese dialects; for instance, there were no erhua, light tone, and no sentences had the heavy or light accent etc.

In 1919, a group of scholars in China published the Dictionary of National Pronunciation. This was one of the earliest dictionaries on modern Mandarin based on the Beijing dialect of Mandarin. However, the dictionary was a mix of northern Chinese sounds and southern Chinese rhymes, which included a 5th tone; the checked tone (rù shēng or ).  It wasn't until 1932 that a dictionary called the Vocabulary of National Pronunciation for Everyday Use, which was based truly on the Beijing dialect, was published. This dictionary standardized the form of Mandarin taught in Singapore's Chinese schools. During the 1930s and 1940s, new immigrants from China, known as xīn kè helped to established more Chinese schools in Singapore, increasing the propagation of Mandarin Chinese in Singapore. The name of Mandarin in Singapore was eventually changed from Guoyu (i.e. National Language) to Huayu (i.e. Chinese Language).

From the 1950s till 1970, as most of the Chinese books and literature came from Taiwan or Hong Kong, Singaporean Mandarin was subjected to influence from Taiwanese Mandarin. After the 1980s, due to the open door policy of mainland China, Singapore began to have greater contact with mainland China. Consequently, Singapore began to adopt Hanyu Pinyin and changed its writing system from Traditional Chinese characters to Simplified Chinese characters. After the Speak Mandarin Campaign in 1979, the Promote Mandarin Council started research on Mandarin standardization based on case studies in mainland China and Taiwan.

After the 1990s, due to greater contacts between Singapore and mainland China, there was a large influx of new Chinese migrants from mainland China. Consequently, much of the lexicon of Putonghua found its way into Singaporean Mandarin. Today's Singaporean Mandarin continues to be influenced from Putonghua, as well as Taiwanese Mandarin and Hong Kong's Cantonese.

Differences from Standard Mandarin

Lexicon (Vocabulary)

Major differences between Singaporean Mandarin Huayu and Putonghua lie in the vocabulary used. A lack of contact between Singapore and China from 1949 to 1979 meant that Singaporean Mandarin had to invent new words to fit the local context, as well as borrow words from Taiwanese Mandarin or other Chinese varieties that were spoken in Singapore. As a result, new Mandarin words proprietary to Singapore were invented.

The Dictionary of Contemporary Singaporean Mandarin Vocabulary edited by Wang Huidi listed 1,560 uniquely local Singaporean Mandarin words, which are not used in Mainland China or Taiwan.

Unique Singaporean Mandarin words
There are many new terms that are specific to living in Singapore. These words were either translated from Malay and Chinese dialects (or invented) as there were no equivalent words in Putonghua. Some of the words are taken from the Hokkien translation of Malay words. Words translated from Malay into Hokkien include kampung, pasar (English 'market'). This explains the uniquely Singapore Mandarin words.

Same meaning, different words
There are some words used in Singaporean Mandarin that have the same meaning with other words used in Putonghua or Taiwanese Mandarin:

Same word, different meanings

There are certain similar words used in both Singaporean Mandarin and Putonghua, but have different meanings and usage.

Loanwords and influence from other Sinitic Languages

There is quite a number of specific words used in Singaporean Mandarin that originate from other Chinese varieties such as Hokkien, Teochew, Cantonese etc. These languages have also influenced the pronunciation in Singaporean Mandarin.

Loanwords and English influences

There is quite a number of specific words used in Singaporean Mandarin that originate or are transliterated from English. These words appear in written Singaporean Mandarin.

Grammar

In terms of standard written Mandarin in Singapore, the Singaporean Mandarin grammar is almost similar to that of Putonghua. However, the grammar of colloquial Singaporean Mandarin can differ from that of Putonghua as a result of influence from other varieties of Chinese, classical Chinese and English. Some of the local Singaporean Mandarin writings do exhibit certain local Singaporean features.

Time

When speaking of minutes, colloquial  Singaporean Mandarin typically uses the word 字 (zì), which represents a unit of 5 minutes. When referring to a number of hours (duration), 鐘頭 (zhōngtóu) is used instead of 小時 (xiǎoshí). For instance:

5 minutes:  一個字 (yī gè zì)
10 minutes: 兩個字 (liǎng gè zì)
15 minutes: 三個字 (sān gè zì)
45 minutes: 九個字 (jiǔ gè zì)
1 hour: 一個鐘頭 (yī gè zhōng tóu)

The use of zì (字) originates from Hokkien (jī or lī), Cantonese or Classical Chinese. Its origin came from the ancient Chinese units of measuring time. In ancient Chinese time measurement, hours were measured in terms of shíchén (時辰), equivalent to 2 hours while minutes were measured in terms of kè (刻), equivalent to 15 minutes. Each kè was in turn divided into 3 zì (equivalent to 5 minutes). For instance, 7:45 pm is:

     or   。 (Singaporean Mandarin)
    。 (Standard Mandarin)

Days of the week
As a result of Hokkien influence, colloquial Singaporean Mandarin typically uses the word "拜-" (bài) to refer to the days of the week, in lieu of Standard Mandarin "星期-" (xīngqí-). For instance:

Monday: 拜一 (bàiyī) instead of 星期一 (xīngqíyī)
Sunday: 礼拜天 (lǐbàitiān) or simply 礼拜 (lǐbài) instead of 星期日 (xīngqírì)
A week: 一个礼拜  (yī gè lǐbài) instead of the more formal 一个星期 (yī gè xīngqí)

Both 拜 (bài) and 礼拜 (lǐbài) originate from Hokkien pài and lé-pài respectively.

Large numbers

In colloquial Singaporean Mandarin, 万 (wàn), referring to a "ten thousand" is often used, but 十千 (shí qiān), referring to "ten thousands" is occasionally used too. This usage was influenced by English numbering system and also Chinese Indonesian who frequently uses large Indonesian currency, Rp10000 (0.71 USD) and above.

Use of the word "先"
 
The word "先" (xiān) is often used at the end of a sentence in colloquial Singaporean Mandarin (instead of after a subject, as in Standard Mandarin), as a result of influence from Cantonese grammar. For example, take the sentence "You walk first":
 
  。 (Singaporean Mandarin)
  。 (Standard Mandarin)
  。 (Cantonese)
(Note that the reverse, "你先走," is ungrammatical in spoken Cantonese.)

The use of the word "而已"

而已 (éryǐ) is more common in colloquial Singaporean Mandarin than in Standard Mandarin, which uses 罢了 (bàle). While 而已 (éryǐ) is also used in colloquial Mandarin within Mainland China, but perhaps to a lesser extent as compared to Singapore or Taiwan. For example:

Translation: only like this / only this kind!
   ！ (Singaporean Mandarin)
  ！ (Standard Mandarin)
   ！ (Taiwanese Mandarin)

The use of the word "大只" "小只"
When people describe the size of animals, for example, chicken, these are used to mean 'small' 'large'. Putonghua tends to use "肥""瘦" instead. These two words are used to refer to the body frame of a person. "大只" refers to people who appear to be tall, masculine or with a large body build. "小只" is used to describe people with a small built, tiny frame.

Use of the word "啊" as an affirmative

In colloquial Singaporean Mandarin, the word "啊" is often used in response to a sentence as an affirmative. Putonghua tends to use "是(的)/对啊/对呀" (shì (de)/duì a/duì ya)， "哦" (ó), "噢" (ō), "嗯" (en/ng) to mean "yes, it is".

Use of the word "才" instead of "再"
In Singaporean Mandarin, there is a greater tendency to use the word cái "才" (then) in lieu of Standard Mandarin zài "再" (then), which indicates a future action after the completion of a prior action. For instance:

"关税申报单刚巧用完了，打算在飞机上领了才填写。"
The tax declaration forms have all been used up, will have to get a form on the plane then and fill it out.

"现在不要说，等他吃饱了才说。"
Don't say anything now; say it only after he has finished his meal.

The use of the word "有" 

In Standard Mandarin, one typical way of turning certain nouns into adjectives, such as 兴趣 (xìngqù, 'interest'), 营养 (yíngyǎng, 'nutrition'), 礼貌  (lǐmào, 'politeness'), is to prefix the word "有" (yǒu) at the front of these nouns.

For example:

"很有兴趣" (hěn yǒu xìngqù – very interested)
"很有营养" (hěn yǒu yíngyǎng – very nutritious)
"很有礼貌" (hěn yǒu lǐmào – very polite).

The word 有 (yǒu) is sometimes omitted in writing.

Reduplication of verbs preceding "一下"

In Singaporean Mandarin, verbs preceding "一下" may be reduplicated, unlike in Putonghua. This practice is borrowed from the Malay and Indonesian method of pluralizing words. In Putonghua grammar, the use of the word "一下(儿)" (yīxià(r)) is often put at the back of a verb to indicate that the action (as indicated by the verb) is momentary.

For example:

   。(Singaporean Mandarin)
  。(Standard Mandarin)
Think for a while.

   。 (Singaporean Mandarin)
  。(Standard Mandarin)
Research for a little while.

Colloquial use of the word "被"
Singaporean Colloquial Mandarin tends to use 被 (bèi) more often than Putonghua, due to influence from English and/or Malay. It is used to express a passive verb.

Compare the following:

"The road has been repaired"
    (Singaporean Mandarin)
    (Putonghua)

Using adjective as verb

Sometimes, colloquial Singaporean Mandarin might use intransitive verbs as transitive.

For instance

"进步" (improve) is an intransitive verb. But as influenced by the use of English, "I want to improve my Chinese" is sometimes said in Singaporean Mandarin as "我要进步我的华语". The standard Mandarin should be "我要让我的华语进步"

Phonology and tones

The phonology and tones of Singaporean Mandarin are generally similar to that of Standard Mandarin. There are  4 tones similar to those in Standard Mandarin, but Erhua (儿化, -er finals) and the neutral tone (轻声, lit. 'light tone') are generally absent in Singaporean Mandarin.

The earliest development of Singaporean Mandarin includes the old Beijing phonology (老国音), followed by new Beijing phonology (新国音) and then finally Hanyu Pinyin of mainland China. In its initial development, Singaporean Mandarin was highly influenced by the Ru sheng (入聲, checked tones or "5th tones") from other Chinese varieties. As such, the 5th tone did appear in earlier Singaporean Mandarin. The characteristics of the 5th tone are as follows:

 It is a falling tone. The common tone letter is 51, but sometimes it is 53.
 The tone does not last long. It feels more like an 'interrupted stop'.
 The syllable which carries the tone had a glottal stop; sometimes the final sounds to be clear, but sometimes, it does not sound very clear. This glottal stop not only interrupts the lasting period of the tone, but also makes the start of consonant stronger, thus nearing itself more to a voiced consonant.

However, due to years of putonghua influence, prevalence of the 5th tone in Singaporean Mandarin is declining. This means that the Singaporean Mandarin had inclined itself towards Standard Chinese.

Minor differences occur between the phonology (tones) of Standard Singaporean Mandarin and other forms of Standard Mandarin.

Influences from other languages in Singapore

Just like any languages in Singapore, Singaporean Mandarin is subjected to influences from other languages spoken in Singapore.

Singaporean Hokkien is the largest non-Mandarin Chinese variety spoken in Singapore. The natural tendency of Hokkien-speakers to use the Hokkien way to speak Mandarin has influenced to a large degree the colloquial Mandarin spoken in Singapore. The colloquial Hokkien-style Singaporean Mandarin is commonly heard in Singapore, and can differ from Putonghua in terms of vocabulary, phonology and grammar.

Besides Singaporean Hokkien, Mandarin is also subjected to influence coming from other Chinese dialects such as Teochew, Cantonese, Hakka, and Hainanese, as well as English and Malay.

Writing system

In Singapore, simplified Chinese characters are the official standard used in all official publications as well as the government-controlled press. While simplified Chinese characters are taught exclusively in schools, the government does not officially discourage the use of Traditional characters. Therefore, many shop signs continue to use Traditional characters.

As there is no restriction on the use of traditional characters in the mass media, television programmes, books, magazines and music CDs that have been imported from Hong Kong or Taiwan are widely available, and these almost always use Traditional characters. Most karaoke discs, being imported from Hong Kong or Taiwan, have song lyrics in Traditional characters as well. While all official publications are in simplified characters, the government still allows parents to choose whether to have their child's Chinese name registered in Simplified or Traditional characters though most choose the former.

Singapore had undergone three successive rounds of character simplification, eventually arriving at the same set of Simplified characters as the People's Republic of China. Before 1969, Singapore generally used Traditional characters. From 1969 to 1976, the Ministry of education launched its own version of Simplified characters, which differed from that of mainland China. But after 1976, Singapore fully adopted the Simplified characters of mainland China.

Chinese writing style and literature

Chinese writing style

Before the May Fourth Movement in 1919, Singapore Chinese writings were based on Classical Chinese. After the May Fourth Movement, under the influence from the New Culture Movement in China, the Chinese schools in Singapore began to follow the new education reform as advocated by China's reformist and changed the writing style to Vernacular Chinese.

Singapore's Chinese newspaper had witnessed this change from Vernacular Chinese. Lat Pau (叻報), one of the earliest Chinese newspaper, was still using Classical Chinese in 1890. By 1917, it continued to use Classical Chinese. But by 1925, it had changed to Vernacular Chinese. After this, all Chinese newspaper in Singapore used Vernacular Chinese.

Singaporean Chinese Literature
The development of the Singaporean Chinese literature reflected the history of immigrants in Singapore. When many Chinese writers from Southern China arrived in Singapore, they established Chinese schools, newspaper press etc. They contributed a lot to the development of Chinese literature in Singapore. In 1919, the New National Magazine 《新國民雜誌》 marked the birth of Singaporean Chinese literature. In those days, the migrant's mindset was still deeply entrenched. Many of the literary works were influenced by New Culture Movement. Most of the literary works that were published originated from the works of writers in China.

In 1925, the presence of literary supplements such as "Southern Wind" 《南風》, "Light of Singapore 《星光》" brought a new dimension to Singaporean Chinese literature. They differed from past magazine that relied on writers from China. It was at this time, that the thoughts of Nanyang began to surface the corner. In January 1927, the "Deserted Island" 《荒島》 published in the "New National Press" 《新國民日報》 clearly reflected the features of Nanyang in its literary work. The "localization" literary works mostly described the lifestyle in Nanyang, the people and their feelings in Nayang. The quality of Singaporean Chinese literature had greatly improved.

In 1937, the outbreak of Second Sino-Japanese War raised the anti-Japanese sentiment. The literature during these times reflected the missions of national salvation against the Japanese. This brought a halt to the localization movement and in turn re-enacted a sense of Chinese nationalism amongst the migrants in Singapore. From 1941 till 1945, during the Japanese occupation of Singapore, the activities for Chinese literature was halted.

After the war, people in Singapore began to have a sense of belonging to this piece of land, and they also had a desire for freedom and democracy. During this times, Singaporean Chinese literature was inclined towards Anti-colonialism. With new arts and thoughts, between 1947 – 1948, there was a debate between "Unique Singaporean Literary Art" and "literary thoughts of migrants". The results from these debated led to a conclusion that the Singaporean Chinese literature was going to develop on its own independently. The "localization" clearly marked the mature development of Singaporean Chinese literature.

During the 1950s, writers from Singapore drew their literary works mostly from the local lifestyle and events that reflected the lifestyle from all areas of the society. They also included many Chinese-dialect proverbs in their works. They created unique works of literature. Writers including Miao Xiu, Yao Zhi, Zhao Rong, Shu Shu etc. represented the writers of "localization" works.

From 1960 to 1970, the number of literary works published began to increase. Locally-born and locally bred Singaporean writers became the new writers in the stage of Singaporean Chinese literature. Their works were mainly based on the views of Singaporeans towards issues or context happening in Singapore. They continued the "localization" movement and brought the Singaporean Chinese literature to a new dimension.

Arts and entertainment

Music

After the Speak Mandarin Campaign in 1979, all Chinese TV programs using other Chinese varieties were replaced by Mandarin programs. Singapore also started to broadcast Mandopop. The birth of Xinyao during the 1980s injected a new life to the creation of lyrics for Mandopop in Singapore. Singapore radios also began to have Singapore Billboards for Mandopop. This allowed Singapore to be developed into a major center for Mandopop in South East Asia. There were also many Mandopop artist coming from Singapore such as Stefanie Sun, JJ Lin, Tanya Chua, etc.

Opera

Movies

TV Drama Serial

News
At the moment, there are 2 television channels with news bulletin programmes in Chinese.

Sociolinguistics

Politics
Language plays an important role in Singapore politics. Up to today, it is still important for politicians in Singapore to be able to speak their mother tongue (and even other dialects) fluently in order to reach out to the multilingual community in Singapore.

According to observation, an election candidate who is able to speak fluent Mandarin has a higher chance of winning an election. As such, most election candidates will try to use Mandarin in campaign speeches in order to attract Mandarin-speaking voters.

Singaporean Mandarin Standard

Some Chinese elites in Singapore had criticized that the Mandarin standard of Chinese Singaporean has dropped greatly due to the closure or subsequent conversion of Chinese-medium schools to English-medium schools in the 1980s. Others attributed the drop in standard to the lack of learning Chinese literature in schools.

Ever since 1965 when Singapore became independent, bilingual policy has become the pillar of Singapore's education. The first language of Singapore was English, while Mandarin was chosen as the "mother tongue" of Chinese Singaporean. Generally, most Chinese Singaporean can speak Mandarin fluently, but are usually weaker in writing Chinese.

Influence of Mainland China's economic rise on Singapore

In recent years, with the subsequent economic rise of mainland China and a transition from a world factory to a world market, Mandarin has become the 2nd most influential language after English. Besides transmitting Chinese culture values, many people began to realize the economic values of Mandarin, which has raised the interests of local and working professionals in learning Mandarin.

Changes in mother tongue and dialect preservation
The native mother tongue of Chinese Singaporeans are of various non-mandarin Chinese varieties, such as Hokkien, Teochew or Cantonese. This was certainly true when southern Chinese migrants came to Singapore. However, with the Speak Mandarin campaign, Chinese Singaporeans were encouraged to change their home language from these other varieties to Mandarin, and then later from Mandarin to English. Mandarin was designated as the "mother tongue" of all Chinese Singaporeans in Singapore and all other native Chinese varieties were reduced to the "dialect" status, with no official recognition as a proper language.

In recent years, however, there has been an increasing awareness of topolect preservation, due to the great decline in the use of other Chinese varieties in Singapore. Most young Chinese Singaporeans were unable to speak these languages effectively and were thus unable to communicate with their grandparents, who are more fluent in them. This has caused a language barrier between generations. As such, there is a minority of Singaporeans working to help preserve or spread these forgotten languages in Singapore.

Language policy and culture

Under the bilingual policy of Singapore, Chinese Singaporeans had a greater chance to speak and use English especially in school and at work. But this can cause a relative limitation in the use of mother tongue. Generally speaking, most Chinese Singaporeans are able to speak Mandarin, and also read newspapers in it, but only a minority is able to use it at a professional level such as academic research, literary writing etc. In the endeavor to use English, some Chinese Singaporeans even distanced themselves from the mother tongue culture, resulting in the erosion of Chinese culture in Singapore.

See also
 Standard Singaporean Mandarin
 Singdarin
 Singapore Chinese Characters
 Speak Mandarin Campaign
 Chinese Singaporean
 Languages of Singapore
 Comparison of national standards of Chinese
 Standard Mandarin

References

Notes

Chinese books
, September 2002, ，  (Zhou, Qinghai (2002), Vocabulary and Grammar of Singaporean Mandarin, Lingzi Media)
, 2009, 、 (Zhou, Qinghai (2009), The changing languages, Lingzi Media)

Bibliography in Chinese

Differences between Huayu and Putonghua
Teacher from China feels that Singaporean Mandarin is very lively
Comparison of Vocabulary used in Huayu and Putonghua
Influence of Singaporean Mandarin on PRC Mandarin
An Overview over the Changes of Singaporean Mandarin.

Languages of Singapore
Chinese languages in Singapore
Mandarin Chinese